Richard Montgomery High School (RMHS) (#201) is a secondary public school located in Rockville, Maryland.

Academics
The school houses Montgomery County's first International Baccalaureate Diploma Programme (IB). This competitive-entry magnet program draws students from all over Montgomery County and has an IB diploma rate of 97%, the highest of its kind in the United States. The IB program has a 10% acceptance rate for incoming freshmen. Entry is based on an entrance examination, middle school transcripts, teacher recommendations, and personal essays.

Incoming freshmen who have been accepted into the IB program are first enrolled in a special two-year program consisting of courses designed to prepare them for more rigorous IB courses they will take in their junior and senior years. This also serves as a continuation of the final two years of the Middle Years Programme (MYP). The first three years of the MYP program are offered to all students who attend Julius West Middle School, which is the sole middle school that feeds into RM. The MYP curriculum stresses "life long learning," "critical thinking," and "responsible global citizenship." It is a five-year program designed for students in grades 6–10, and all Richard Montgomery students participate regardless of whether they are in the IB program or whether they participated in middle school. Upon completion, non-IB students can apply to enroll in the IB programme. Students are accepted each year through this secondary application process for the IB programme.

The average class size is 24.8, although this number has recently been increasing, and it has a student to staff ratio of 14.5:1.

In 2007, Richard Montgomery was featured in Newsweek magazine as the 27th highest-rated high school in the nation. In June 2002, it won its first award in National Scholastic Championship at George Washington University. Richard Montgomery High School won the 2003 Blue Ribbon in Education Award by the United States Department of Education. RM has been identified as the number one school in the D.C. metropolitan area in the Challenge Index for Rigor. Richard Montgomery has also had multiple Marian Greenblatt Education Fund award winner teachers.

History and campus

Richard Montgomery High School is the oldest public high school in Montgomery County. It was first established in 1892 as "Rockville High School", when the state Board of Education first allocated funds to local school to educate high school students. The first class of twelve seniors graduated in 1897.

A new high school was constructed and opened for use in September 1905 on East Montgomery Avenue and Monroe Street. An addition was built in 1917, expanding the school to 19 classrooms. Rockville Colored High School was opened in 1927. The school for white students was renamed Richard Montgomery High School to distinguish between the two in 1935.

The current campus is 26.2 acres (106,000 m²) in size.

Carrasco went on extended sick leave.

During Carrasco's absence, the student newspaper, The Tide, requested that administrators approve publication of an article about the investigation into Carrasco's alleged ethics violations and business endeavors. Assistant Principal Veronica McCall denied permission for publication of the article, but was overridden by Community Superintendent Dr. Sherry Liebes after The Tide editors announced that they would go public with news of the denial. The article was finally published online on April 24, 2008.

On June 10, 2008, Montgomery County Public Schools announced that Carrasco had been named the new director of secondary leadership training. The announcement also stated that the allegations about Carrasco's involvement in private consulting were "thoroughly investigated" and "not substantiated".

On June 23, 2008, Nelson McLeod II was named the new principal of Richard Montgomery High School. He left the position in May 2014 due to a cardiac medical condition, and was replaced by Damon Monteleone in July 2014.

In 2020, a petition was started to rename the school due to its namesake, Richard Montgomery, being a slave owner.

Reconstruction
Richard Montgomery opened a new $71 million building following the end of students' 2007 winter break. The new building features wireless internet for the teachers which has since been opened to student access, LCD projectors in every classroom, dozens of Promethean interactive whiteboards and learner response devices, a modern auditorium, and a recording and TV studio. The new facilities lack the capability to access older forms of media, such as material on VHS and photographic slides; however, teachers sometimes bring in their own video players to rectify the problem.

The school has an artificial turf stadium next to tennis courts and a track.

Athletics
Athletics Director, Jon Freda, is an RM Alum class of 2001. Freda has been at Richard Montgomery HS since 2007 and has been the schools Athletic Director since 2010. The boys' cross country team have won four state championships, in 1975, 1980, 1990 and 1995.

Activities
Richard Montgomery has its own student newspaper, The Tide, and a student literary magazine, Fine Lines. The Tide received First Place with Special Merit from the America Scholastic Press Association in 2013.

Richard Montgomery's quizbowl team (known as It's Academic) won the National Scholastics Championship in 2002. In 2006, they won the NAQT High School National Championship Tournament in Chicago.

Richard Montgomery's International Space Settlement Design Competition team won the 2008 cycle in Houston, Texas.

Music

Ensembles such as the Madrigals, a chamber choir, and the Jazz Band often travel off campus to perform at various venues. The marching band, the Marching Rockets, is also a part of football season.

Notable alumni
Will Allen, basketball player and urban farmer, MacArthur Award winner 
Tori Amos, singer
Norman Bellingham, Olympic athlete
Wolfgang Bodison, actor
Gordy Coleman, Major League Baseball (MLB) first baseman
Mike Curtis, National Football League (NFL) linebacker
Russell C. Davis, mayor of Jackson, Mississippi from 1969-1977
Mahan Esfahani, harpsichordist
Dan Fishback, singer-songwriter
Rhadi Ferguson, judo and MMA athlete
Julia Galef, writer and philosopher 
Caroline Green and Gordon Green, figure skaters.
Marc Korman, state delegate
Thuan Pham, former CTO of Uber
Zachary Pincus-Roth, author
Tuan Wreh, Liberian triple jumper
Jim Riggleman, MLB manager
Kurt Schork, journalist
Joseph Takahashi, neurobiologist, member of the National Academy of Sciences.
Father John Misty, alternative rock singer/songwriter

References

External links

Richard Montgomery High School's website

Montgomery High School
Montgomery High School
Montgomery High School
Montgomery High School
Schools in Rockville, Maryland
1892 establishments in Maryland